Procecidochares stonei is a species of tephritid or fruit flies in the genus Procecidochares of the family Tephritidae. It is found in the United States.

References

Tephritinae
Insects described in 1961
Diptera of North America
Procecidochares